Leratiomyces squamosus is an inedible mushroom in the family Strophariaceae.

References

External links

Inedible fungi
Strophariaceae